Costatophora is a genus of gastropods belonging to the family Triphoridae.

The species of this genus are found in Australia and Malesia.

Species:

Costatophora borealis 
Costatophora granifera 
Costatophora iniqua 
Costatophora mapoonensis 
Costatophora mcgilpi 
Costatophora pallida 
Costatophora princeps 
Costatophora pulcherrima 
Costatophora serana

References

Gastropods